Attica is an unincorporated community in Jackson County, in the U.S. state of Georgia.

History
The community was named after Attica, an historical region of Greece.

References

Unincorporated communities in Jackson County, Georgia